Feliciano López was the champion in 2014, when the men's event was last held, but withdrew before the tournament began.

Novak Djokovic won the title, defeating Gaël Monfils in the final, 6–3, 6–4. This tournament marked the first time since 2010 that Djokovic played a grass-court tournament before Wimbledon. It was also the only tournament that Djokovic won without his coach being Marián Vajda until the duo split in 2022.

Seeds
The top four seeds receive a bye into the second round.

Draw

Finals

Top half

Bottom half

Qualifying

Seeds

Qualifiers

Qualifying draw

First qualifier

Second qualifier

Third qualifier

Fourth qualifier

References

 Main Draw
 Qualifying Draw

2017 ATP World Tour
2017 Men's Singles